Unhŭng County is a kun, or county, in Ryanggang Province, North Korea.  It was created following the division of Korea from portions of Hyesan and Kapsan.

Geography
Unhŭng lies on the southwest edge of the Paektu lava plateau, among the Paektu Mountains.  The highest of its many peaks is Taegakpong.  The chief streams are the Unch'ong River (운총강), Osich'ŏn (오시천) and Taedongch'ŏn (대동천).  Some 86% of the county's area is forested.

Administrative divisions
Unhŭng county is divided into 1 ŭp (town), 10 rodongjagu (workers' districts) and 10 ri (villages):

Economy
There is relatively little agriculture, except for dry-field farms producing potatoes, wheat and soybeans. Logging is the chief industry, with lumber processing the dominant form of manufacturing. There are also mines, extracting the local deposits of copper, iron sulphide, lead, kaolin and tungsten.

Transportation
Unhŭng is served by road and rail; the Paektusan Ch'ŏngnyŏn Line of the Korean State Railway passes through the county.

See also
Geography of North Korea
Administrative divisions of North Korea
Ryanggang

External links

Counties of Ryanggang